Benjamín Vicedo (born 25 January 1964) is a Spanish former volleyball player who competed in the 1992 Summer Olympics.

References

1964 births
Living people
Spanish men's volleyball players
Olympic volleyball players of Spain
Volleyball players at the 1992 Summer Olympics
Sportspeople from Madrid